Breaking The Frame is an album by Surgeon released in May 2011.

The album was the first full-length album Surgeon has released since 2000's Body Request, and received high reviews from multiple sources such as Resident Advisor and Pitchfork.

Track listing 

"dark matter"
"Transparent Radiation"
"Remover Of Darkness"
"the power of doubt"
"RADIANCE"
"Presence"
"We Are All Already Here"
"those who do not"
"Not-Two"

Personnel
Surgeon

Credits
Artwork by Trudy Creen

References

External links
Back in the Grinder: Breaking The Frame 2
Surgeon: Breaking the Frame - Fact Magazine
Surgeon - Breaking the Frame · Album Review ⟋ RA
Surgeon: Breaking the Frame Album Review | Pitchfork
Surgeon - Breaking the Frame  | Headphone Commute
TEA: Surgeon - Breaking The Frame

2011 albums
Surgeon (musician) albums